Bronzolo is a comune (municipality) in South Tyrol in northern Italy, located about  south of the city of Bolzano. It is one of only five mainly Italian speaking municipalities in South Tyrol.

Geography

Bronzolo borders the following municipalities: Aldein, Laives, Deutschnofen, Auer and Vadena.

History

Coat-of-arms
The arms is party per bend sinister of argent and vert. At the center is a sable cornet trimmed with a cord of or. The vert represents the Etsch mountain and the valleys; the cornet is a reference to the village's long use as a mail station . The emblem was adopted in 1968.

Society

Linguistic distribution
According to the 2011 census, 62.01% of the population speak Italian, 37.34% German and 0.65% Ladin as first language.

Demographic evolution

References

External links
  Homepage of the municipality

Municipalities of South Tyrol